Halo is a drone/sludge metal band formed in Melbourne, Australia in 1994, which is now based in London, England. It is currently signed to Relapse Records.

Discography

 Halo (aka Subliminal Transmissions) (1998) (CDr, Album) Embryo Recordings EMB002 Australia
 Massive Corporate Disease (1999) (CDr, Album + File, MP3) Embryo Recordings EMB003 Australia
 Degree Zero Point of Implosion (2000) (CDr) Embryo Recordings EMB010 Australia
 Guattari (From The West Flows Grey Ash And Pestilence) (2001) (CD, Album) Relapse Records RR 6492-2 USA
 Agoraphobic Nosebleed / Halo - Untitled / Raping The Raper (2002) (7", Ltd) Relapse Records RR-048 USA
 Body of Light (2003) (CD) Relapse Records RR 6573-2 USA
 Live 06:06:01 (2004) (File, MP3) Embryo Recordings EMB018 Australia
 Degree Zero Point of Implosion (2010) (LP, Ltd, Reissue) With Intent Records WIRZERO USA

Current members
Skye Klein - bass, vocals
Robert Allen - drums

Former members
David Ryan - guitar

External links
 https://haloband.bandcamp.com/
 http://www.myspace.com/fearhatelies
 http://www.discogs.com/artist/HALO+(5)
 http://embryo.antisound.net/

Australian heavy metal musical groups
English heavy metal musical groups
Musical groups established in 1994
Relapse Records artists
1994 establishments in Australia